Benigno Andrade García, also known as Foucellas, was a Spanish anarchist and maqui.

Bibliography 
Eduard Pons Prades. Guerrillas españolas (1936-1960). Planeta, Barcelona, 1977. .
V. Luís Lamela García (1993). Foucellas - El riguroso relato de una lucha antifranquista (1936-1952). La Coruña: Edicios do Castro. .
Manuel Astray Rivas (1992). Síndrome del 36 - La IV Agrupación del Ejército Guerrillero de Galicia. La Coruña: Edicios do Castro. .
 

1908 births
1952 deaths
Spanish anarchists
People executed by ligature strangulation
People from A Coruña